Ben Prunty is an American composer, best known for his work on the 2012 video game, FTL: Faster Than Light.

Personal life
Prunty grew up in Scarborough, Maine, but now lives in the San Francisco Bay Area. He played in his high school band, and was always interested in composing music using computers, but lacked musical expertise until preparing to compose the FTL soundtrack. He also grew up playing video games and recalls thinking making music for them would be the "coolest job ever". He attended the New England School of Communications for audio engineering and picked up some skills he would put to use later.

He later moved to California in hopes of getting into the video game industry, but found work at Google as a datacenter technician until receiving the opportunity to make the FTL soundtrack.

Works
Prunty's first notable work was the soundtrack for the 2012 real-time strategy indie game FTL: Faster Than Light. He has also provided music for the following projects:
 Gravity Ghost
 StarCrawlers
 Scale
 FranknJohn
 The Darkside Detective (season one)
 All Walls Must Fall (one track: "Synaesthetic")
 Into the Breach
 Celeste
 Photographs
 Subnautica: Below Zero

References

External links
 Official website

20th-century births
21st-century American composers
21st-century American male musicians
American electronic musicians
American male composers
Living people
Musicians from Maine
People from Scarborough, Maine
Video game composers
Year of birth missing (living people)